Garderobe is a historic term for a room in a medieval castle. The Oxford English Dictionary gives as its first meaning a store-room for valuables, but also acknowledges "by extension, a private room, a bed-chamber; also a privy".

The word derives from the French , meaning "robes (or clothing) protector": thus, a closet or a toilet seat that would tend to prevent clothing from getting soiled.

Its most common use now is as a term for a castle toilet.

Store room
 is the French word for "wardrobe", a lockable place where clothes and other items are stored. According to medieval architecture scholar Frank Bottomley, garderobes were "Properly, not a latrine or privy but a small room or large cupboard, usually adjoining the chamber [bedroom] or solar [living room] and providing safe-keeping for valuable clothes and other possessions of price: cloth, jewels, spices, plate and money."

Toilet

The term garderobe is also used to refer to a medieval or Renaissance toilet or a close stool. In a medieval castle, a garderobe was usually a simple hole discharging to the outside into a cesspit (akin to a pit latrine) or the moat (like a fish pond toilet), depending on the structure of the building. Such toilets were often placed inside a small chamber, leading by association to the use of the term garderobe to describe the rooms. Many can still be seen in Norman and medieval castles and fortifications, for example at Bürresheim Castle in Germany, where three garderobes are still visible. They became obsolete with the introduction of indoor plumbing.

A description of the garderobe at Donegal Castle indicates that while it was in use, it was believed that ammonia would protect visitors' coats and cloaks from moths or fleas.

Other languages
In European public places, a garderobe denotes a cloakroom, wardrobe, alcove, or armoire used to temporarily store the coats and other possessions of visitors. In Danish, Dutch, Estonian, German, Norwegian, Polish, Russian, Spanish, Swedish and Ukrainian, the word can mean a cloakroom. In Latvian, it means "checkroom".

See also 
 Bretèche, a small balcony in a medieval fortress
 Dansker, a German term for a castle toilet in a tower over a watercourse

References 

Castle architecture
Rooms
Toilets